Parapylocheles scorpio is a species of hermit crab in the family Parapylochelidae. It lives at depths from 200 to 925 meters in the Indo-West Pacific, in Indonesia and the Philippines, although it may live in water as shallow as 100 meters, in wood fragments, tusk shells, and pieces of bamboo. It is the only member in its genus, with another genus in its family with one species in it being extinct, Mesoparapylocheles michaeljacksoni.

References 

Hermit crabs
Crustaceans described in 1894
Crustaceans of Indonesia
Fauna of the Philippines